Clarence "Choo-Choo" Coleman (August 25, 1937 – August 15, 2016) was an American professional baseball catcher, who played Major League Baseball (MLB) for the Philadelphia Phillies and New York Mets.

Career
Clarence Coleman was born in Orlando, Florida on August 25, 1937. He signed as an undrafted free agent with the Washington Senators at age 18. He was released by the Senators and signed by the Los Angeles Dodgers, then taken by the Philadelphia Phillies in the rule V draft. In 1961, he appeared in 34 games for the Phillies, getting hit by a pitch in his first Major League plate appearance. He batted only .128 for the Phillies that year in 47 at bats. The Phillies finished in last place that year, a spot soon to be taken by the expansion New York Mets. In the offseason the Mets selected Coleman in the expansion draft. He played parts of three seasons for the Mets, hitting .205 in 415 at bats.

The authors of The Great American Baseball Card Flipping, Trading and Bubble Gum Book, Brendan C. Boyd & Fred C. Harris, Little Brown & Co, 1973, had this to say about Coleman on p. 37, next to a picture of his baseball card: "Choo-Choo Coleman was the quintessence of the early New York Mets. He was a 5'8", 160-pound catcher who never hit over .250 in the majors, had 9 career home runs, 30 career RBIs, and couldn't handle pitchers. Plus his name was Choo-Choo. What more could you ask for?" Casey Stengel once complimented Coleman's speed, saying that he'd never seen a catcher so fast at retrieving passed balls.

After baseball

Upon retirement, Coleman moved back to his home town of Orlando. After his first wife died, Coleman married into a family who owned a Chinese restaurant in Newport News, Virginia. For over two decades, Coleman helped run the business and occasionally worked as a cook. Coleman eventually retired to Bamberg, South Carolina where he lived in obscurity until 2012 when he was invited to the Mets 50th anniversary celebration in New York. During the event Coleman both confirmed and denied some of the stories told about him. During an interview, he also revealed that his friends gave him his nickname "Choo Choo" because as a child "I was fast."

Coleman died on August 15, 2016 in Orangeburg, South Carolina after a battle with cancer.

References

External links

Choo-Choo Coleman at Baseball Almanac
Choo-Choo Coleman at Baseball Gauge
Choo-Choo Coleman at Ultimate Mets Database

Choo-Choo Coleman New York Times Obituary

1937 births
2016 deaths
20th-century African-American sportspeople
21st-century African-American people
African-American baseball players
Baseball players from Orlando, Florida
Buffalo Bisons (minor league) players
Deaths from cancer in South Carolina
Jacksonville Suns players
Macon Dodgers players
Major League Baseball catchers
Montreal Royals players
New York Mets players
Orlando Dodgers players
Orlando Seratomas players
Philadelphia Phillies players
Spokane Indians players
Syracuse Chiefs players
Tidewater Tides players